Dear Claudia is a 1999 Australian romantic comedy.

It was shot on location on Brampton Island also in a small queensland country town called Clifton. Some locals have parts as extras in the film.

References

External links

Dear Claudia at Oz Movies

Australian romantic comedy films
1990s English-language films
1990s Australian films